Asaphodes imperfecta is a moth in the family Geometridae. It is endemic to New Zealand and is found in the southern part of the South Island. The species inhabits low lying swampy native forest. The host plants of the larvae of this species is unknown. The adults are on the wing in December and January.  It is classified as critically endangered by the Department of Conservation.

Taxonomy
This species was first described by Alfred Philpott in 1905 as Xanthorhoe imperfecta. Philpott used specimens he collected in the West Plains suburb of Invercargill. George Hudson discussed and illustrated this species under that name in 1928. In 1939 Louis Beethoven Prout placed this species in the genus Larentia. This placement was not accepted by New Zealand taxonomists. In 1971 J. S. Dugdale placed this species in the genus Asaphodes. In 1988 John S. Dugdale confirmed this placement. The male holotype specimen, collected at West Plains, Invercargill, is held at the New Zealand Arthropod Collection.

Description

Philpott described A. imperfecta as follows:

Distribution
Asaphodes imperfecta is endemic to New Zealand. The species was regarded as being rare and local to the southern part of the South Island. It is now regarded as being locally extinct in its type locality of Invercargill. George Vernon Hudson mentions that it was also present in Dunedin.

Ecology and habitat
Adult moths had been collected in forest and Hudson stated the species preferred low lying swampy forest habitat. Hudson also stated that adult moths were on the wing in December and January.

Host plants
The host plants of this species are unknown.

Conservation status
This moth is classified under the New Zealand Threat Classification system as being Nationally Critical. It has been hypothesised that this species is under threat as a likely result of habitat loss, given the drying out of ecosystems as a result of wetland drainage which in turn ensures the land no longer supports the plants the species lives on in its larvae stage.

References

Moths described in 1905
Moths of New Zealand
Larentiinae
Endemic fauna of New Zealand
Endangered biota of New Zealand
Endemic moths of New Zealand